McKenna of the Mounted is a 1932 American pre-Code Western film directed by D. Ross Lederman. A print is housed in the Library of Congress collection.

Cast

 Buck Jones as Sergeant Tom McKenna
 Greta Granstedt as Shirley Kennedy
 Walter McGrail as Inspector Oliver P. Logan
 Mitchell Lewis as Henchman Pierre
 Niles Welch as Morgan
 Ralph Lewis as Kennedy
 James Flavin as Corporal Randall McKenna
 John Lowell as Man at Meeting

References

External links
 
 

1932 films
1932 Western (genre) films
American Western (genre) films
American black-and-white films
1930s English-language films
Columbia Pictures films
Films directed by D. Ross Lederman
Northern (genre) films
Royal Canadian Mounted Police in fiction
1930s American films